Alpha Beta Psi is a local sorority belonging to the Commonwealth of Virginia.  The organization was founded on October 22, 1978 at Richard Bland College, branching off its secondary school predecessors, Alpha Beta Sigma. Alpha Beta Psi is the first non-Panhellenic sorority to be recognized by Longwood University.

Background

Alpha Beta Psi is composed of Virginia college-educated women from different socio-economic and cultural backgrounds who actively lead social service programs within the school and community.

History

Alpha Beta Psi expanded to Longwood University twenty years after its founding at Richard Bland College of the College of William and Mary.  The sorority dissolved itself temporarily due to low numbers and reemerged on April 13, 2008.  The Longwood University Greek system was initially hesitant in welcoming back Alpha Beta Psi.   Alpha Beta Psi and organizations like it were required to face prejudicial "...barriers that had 'not been appropriate'" in order to discourage their affiliation with campus Greek life.  Withstanding, Alpha Beta Psi regained official recognition as an on-campus sorority by the College Panhellenic Council at Longwood University almost exactly six years later. Alpha Beta Psi is now one of Longwood University's leading on-campus Greek organizations in recruiting and member retention.

Philanthropy
The sorority's philanthropy is dedicated to domestic violence awareness, specifically through its partnership with local women's shelter Madeline's House. The sisters also contribute their time to FACES, a local emergency food service center and The Woodlands, a nearby rehabilitation center. Alpha Beta Psi also participates in Relay for Life with The American Cancer Society every year.

Key Members

References

Fraternities and sororities in the United States
1989 establishments in Virginia